The New York Asian Film Festival (NYAFF) is a critically acclaimed film festival held in New York City, dedicated to the display of Asian Film Culture. The New York Asian Film Festival generally features contemporary premieres and classic titles from Eastern Asia and Southeast Asia (particularly Japan, South Korea, Hong Kong, China, Philippines, and Thailand), though South Asian cinema has also been represented via films from India and Pakistan. The NYAFF displays many of its films as a first-and-only screening in the country, giving audiences the chance to see these films, although they would not be normally distributed in the United States. The up-and-coming actors and directors of the exhibited films are brought over as special guests of the NYAFF every year. Genres featured in the film festival includes Horror film, Gangster/Crime, Martial Arts, and Action. 

Film at Lincoln Center, previously known as the Film Society of Lincoln Center until 2019 is the festival's main institutional partner and home venue since 2010. The New York Asian Film Festival is owned and operated by the nonprofit organization the New York Asian Film Foundation Inc. Every year the annual film festival is organized and curated by executive director Samuel Jamier, programmers Claire Marty, David Wilentz, Karen Severns, and Koichi Mori. The festival's selection is curation-based but also accepts a number of submissions.

Until 2007, the festival was held annually at the Anthology Film Archives and The ImaginAsian around the end of June and early July, the festival's usual time frame. In 2007, the festival moved to the IFC Center and Japan Society, and in 2010, Film at Lincoln Center became the festival's primary home, with SVA Theatre as a second venue.

Starting in 2008, in addition to the Audience Award, the festival also handed out a Jury Prize. In 2013 the Daniel A. Craft Award for Excellence in Action Cinema was added in memory of the festival's late director and treasurer. The festival is also a large engine for filmmakers and their films to be picked up by large name distribution companies in the United States and in Asia.

New York Asian Film Festival screenings

2022 Showcase 

Screenings will be held from July 15–31, 2022 at  Film at Lincoln Center and Asia Society.

2021 Showcase 

Screenings were held from August 6–22, 2021 at SVA Theater.

2020 2nd Winter Showcase 
Screenings were held from Feb 14–16, 2020 at SVA Theater.

2019 
Screenings were held from June 28 - July 14, 2019 at the Film Society of Lincoln Center, and SVA Theater.

2019 1st Winter Showcase 
Screenings were held from February 1–3 & 8-10, 2019 at SVA Theater.

2018 
Screenings were held from June 29 - July 15, 2018 at the Film Society of Lincoln Center, and SVA Theater.

2017 
On March 13 it was announced that the 16th annual New York Asian Film Festival would happen from June 30 - July 16 emanating from the Film Society of Lincoln Center and the SVA Theatre.

The NYAFF Jury Award returned in 2017 with two new categories.  The 2017 NYAFF Jury Award for Best Feature was given to BAD GENIUS. The award was presented to Nattawut Poonpiriya who was in attendance. Special Mention was given to A DOUBLE LIFE while Honorable Mention for Most Promising Director, AKA The Brass Balls Award, was awarded to Lê Bình Giang for Vietnam's Kfc. Jury members included indie actress Jennifer Kim, video-on-demand acquisitions executive George Schmaltz, and NYAFF super fan Kristina Winters.

2016 
Screenings were held from June 22 - July 9, 2016 at the Film Society of Lincoln Center, and SVA Theater.

2015 
Screenings were held from June 26 - July 11, 2015 at the Film Society of Lincoln Center, and SVA Theater.

2014 
Screenings were held from June 27 - July 14, 2014 at the Film Society of Lincoln Center, Asia Society and Japan Society.

2013 
Screenings were held from June 28 - July 15, 2013 at the Film Society of Lincoln Center, Asia Society, and Japan Society.

"Korean Short Film Madness" was showcased with short films from the 11th Mise-en-scène Short Film Festival as part of the New York Asian Film Festival. The following films were available for view on DramaFever:

2012 
Screenings were held from July 29–15, 2012 at the Film Society of Lincoln Center and Japan Society.

"Korean Short Film Madness" was showcased with short films from the 10th Mise-en-scène Short Film Festival as part of the New York Asian Film Festival. The following films were screened:

2011 
Screenings were held from July 1–14, 2011 at the Film Society of Lincoln Center and Japan Society.

The 11th New York Asian Film Festival presented the following films from the 9th Mise-en-scène Short Film Festival:

2010 
Screenings were held from June 25 - July 8, 2010 at the Film Society of Lincoln Center, the IFC Center and Japan Society.

The 10th New York Asian Film Festival presented the following films from the 8th Mise-en-scène Short Film Festival:

2009 
Screenings were held from June 19 - July 5, 2009 at the IFC Center and Japan Society.

The 9th New York Asian Film Festival presented the following films from the 7th Mise-en-scène Short Film Festival:

2008 
Screenings were held from June 20 - July 6, 2008 at the IFC Center and Japan Society.

The 8th New York Asian Film Festival presented the following films from the 6th Mise-en-scène Short Film Festival:

2007 
Screenings were held from June 22 - July 8, 2007 at the IFC Center and Japan Society.

The 7th New York Asian Film Festival presented following films from the 5th Mise-en-scène Short Film Festival:

2006 
Screenings were held from June 16 - July 1, 2006 at Anthology Film Archives and The ImaginAsian.

2005 
Screenings were held from June 17 - July 2, 2005 at  Anthology Film Archives and The ImaginAsian.

2004 
Screenings were held from June 18–27, 2004 at Anthology Film Archives.

2003 
Screenings were held from May 15–26, 2003 at Anthology Film Archives.

2002 
Screenings were held from April 26 - May 2, 2002 at Anthology Film Archives.

Audience Award

Uncaged Award for Best Feature Film

Daniel A. Craft Award for Excellence in Action Cinema

{| class="wikitable"
|-
! Year !! Winner !! Country !! Director/Actor/Title
|-
|2013 || Ip Man: The Final Fight  ||  ||Herman Yau
|-
|2014 || The White Storm  ||  ||Benny Chan
|-
|2015 || Vengeance of an Assassin   ||  || Panna Rittikrai
|-
|2016 || The Bodyguard  || || Yue Song
|-
|rowspan=2|2017|| The Villainess  || || Jung Byung-gil
|-
|Hapkido 合氣道
|
|Angela Mao
|-
|2018 || Operation Red Sea  红海行动 ||  || Dante Lam
|-
|2019 || Master Z  葉問外傳：張天志 ||  || Yuen Woo-ping
|-
|2020 || Silat Warriors: Deed of Death  (Geran) ||  || Areel Abu Bakar
|-
|2021 || Spiritwalker  || || Yoon Kye-sang
|-
|2022 || Jang Hyuk||    ||For The Swordsman and The Killer: A Girl Who Deserves to Die
|-
|}

Star Asia Award

Star Asia Lifetime Achievement Award

Star Hong Kong Lifetime Achievement Award 

Screen International Rising Star Asia Award (a.k.a. Rising Star Award)

Best from the East Award

The Celebrity Award

See also
Asian cinema

References

External links
 

Kaiju Shakedown – Variety's'' Asian cinema blog, written by festival organizer Grady Hendrix (relaunched on Variety Asia - 2007).

Asian-American culture in New York City
Film festivals in New York City
Fantasy and horror film festivals in the United States
Asian-American film festivals